The Old Bell is the name of many inns, hotels and public houses in the United Kingdom, including:

The Old Bell, Fleet Street, London, established 17th century
The Old Bell, Henley on Thames, established 1325
The Old Bell, Malmesbury, established 1220
The Old Bell Hotel, Derby, established 1650
The Old Bell Museum, Montgomery, a former 16th-century inn
The Olde Bell, Hurley, established 1135
The Olde Bell, Rye, established 1390

See also
Bell public house (disambiguation)
Bell Hotel (disambiguation)